Patrick Brugnoli (born 12 April 1970) is an Italian ice hockey player. He competed in the men's tournaments at the 1994 Winter Olympics and the 1998 Winter Olympics.

References

External links
 

1970 births
Living people
Italian ice hockey players
Olympic ice hockey players of Italy
Ice hockey players at the 1994 Winter Olympics
Ice hockey players at the 1998 Winter Olympics
Sportspeople from the Province of Sondrio